Laxman Pandurang Jagtap (15 February 1963 – 3 January 2023) was an Indian politician from Chinchwad in the city of Pune. He was elected as a member of the Maharashtra Legislative Assembly from Chinchwad for 2009 – 2014 as an independent candidate. He was the M.L.A. of Chinchwad.

Jagtap contested the 2014 Lok Sabha elections from Maval constituency as a Peasants and Workers Party of India candidate. He contested again for the same assembly constituency in 2014 but as BJP candidate instead. He was a member of the legislative assembly.

Jagtap died in Baner on 3 January 2023, at the age of 59.

References

1963 births
2023 deaths
People from Pimpri-Chinchwad
Marathi politicians
Peasants and Workers Party of India politicians
Maharashtra MLAs 2004–2009
Candidates in the 2014 Indian general election
Bharatiya Janata Party politicians from Maharashtra
Maharashtra MLAs 2014–2019
Members of the Maharashtra Legislative Council